Cheli is jargon found in Madrid, Spain.

Cheli may also refer to:

Cheli (surname)
Cheli (footballer) (born 1979), Spanish footballer
Cheli, a former name of Jinghong
Cheli, Iran (disambiguation)